Julian Massiah McDonald (born 20 August 1990) is a Montserratian footballer who plays for Shepshed Dynamo. He made his international debut for Montserrat in March 2015.

Career

Club career 
Following his release from Notts County as a youngster, McDonald began his non-league career with Alfreton Town, breaking into the first team at the tender age of 16 in the 2006–07 season after two years in the youth set-up. Making three appearances in the first team, Scorong once. He joined Rainworth Milners Welfare in 2008, and spent two years with the club. Departing the club in May 2010, the forward spent a season with Carlton Town, scoring 22 times in 35 appearances.

Completing a switch to Worksop Town in August 2011, McDonald joined the club for 18 months. His spell also included a one-month loan at Matlock Town in October 2011, but he made the move permanent a month later before remaining with the club until the end of the season. He scored nine times in 30 games for the Gladiators.

On 8 August 2014, McDonald re-joined Alfreton Town at the age of 23. Spending a single season with club, he also had a one-month loan away from North Street when joining Boston United in late January 2015. However, he failed to score in four appearances for the Pilgrims, while scoring twice for Alfreton throughout the season.

In May 2015, McDonald dropped down a division in order to join Bradford Park Avenue. Joining Mickleover Sports on a one-month loan in September 2015, he scored on his debut in a 2–0 win over Buxton. McDonald then signed for Rushall Olympic on a one-month loan in October 2015, and scored two goals on his debut.

Initially joining Corby Town on a one-month loan in December 2015, McDonald opted for a second spell with the Steelmen a few weeks after, and headed to Steel Park on loan for the remainder of the season.

On 21 May 2016, Coalville Town announced that McDonald had signed a one-year deal with the club. He signed for AFC Rushden & Diamonds in July 2019.

On 14 December 2021, McDonald signed for Shepshed Dynamo.

International career 
McDonald made his international debut for Montserrat on 27 March 2015, featuring in a 2–1 defeat to Curaçao during 2018 World Cup qualification. He made his second appearance three days later, in a 2–2 draw with Curaçao in the same competition. After 3 years away from the national team, he returned to action in October 2018 in a 1–0 win over Belize.

References 

1991 births
Living people
Montserratian footballers
Montserrat international footballers
English footballers
English people of Montserratian descent
Footballers from Nottingham
Alfreton Town F.C. players
Rainworth Miners Welfare F.C. players
Carlton Town F.C. players
Worksop Town F.C. players
Matlock Town F.C. players
King's Lynn Town F.C. players
Boston United F.C. players
Bradford (Park Avenue) A.F.C. players
Mickleover Sports F.C. players
Rushall Olympic F.C. players
Corby Town F.C. players
Coalville Town F.C. players
Stafford Rangers F.C. players
Barwell F.C. players
AFC Rushden & Diamonds players
Ilkeston Town F.C. players
Newark F.C. players
Gresley F.C. players
Nuneaton Borough F.C. players
Shepshed Dynamo F.C. players
Association football forwards
National League (English football) players
Northern Premier League players
Southern Football League players